Live is Delbert McClinton's 2nd live album and 23rd album overall. It is a double-disc album and was released on October 21, 2003. The album was recorded at the Bergen Musicfest / Ole Blues 2003 at Teatergaragen in Bergen, Norway.

Critical reception

Hal Horowitz writes in his AllMusic review that "this is a nearly perfect document of Delbert McClinton, captured in his natural habitat with all the sweat, intensity, and frisky fun intact."

Track listing

Musicians
Delbert McClinton: Vocals, Harmonica
Kevin McKendree: Keyboards
George Hawkins: Bass
Rob McNelley: Guitar
Lynn Williams: Drums
Terry Townson: Trumpet
Don Wise: Saxophone

Production
Wendy Goldstein: Executive Producer
Cameron Strang: Executive Producer
Delbert McClinton: Producer
Njaal Oyvind Mangersnes: Engineer
Arild Grindheim: Engineer
Don Smith: Mixing
Doug Sax: Mastering
Robert Hadley: Mastering
Ragena Warden: Production Coordinator
John McElroy: House Sound
Mark Allison: Stage Sound
All track information and credits were taken from the album's liner notes.

References

External links
Delbert McClinton Official Site

2003 live albums
New West Records live albums
Delbert McClinton albums